The Biggest Game Show in the World may refer to:
 The Biggest Game Show in the World Asia
 The Biggest Game Show in the World (Greek TV series)